WFHN (107.1 FM), better known as Fun 107, is a contemporary hit radio station that serves the New Bedford-Fall River, Massachusetts, market along with (to a lesser extent) the Providence, Rhode Island, market. The station is licensed to Fairhaven, Massachusetts, and is owned by Townsquare Media. The studio is located in Fairhaven, Massachusetts, shared with WBSM. The transmitter is located in New Bedford, Massachusetts, on Pope's Island on a tower shared with W243BG. The station was originally built by broadcast engineer Randy Place in 1988–1989.

The call sign is drawn from the city of license, Fairhaven (FHN) and can also represent the word "FUN", the station's moniker.

References

External links
Official Website

Contemporary hit radio stations in the United States
FHN
Radio stations established in 1989
Fairhaven, Massachusetts
Mass media in Bristol County, Massachusetts
Townsquare Media radio stations